Katrina Renee Jackson (born July 1977) is a lawyer from Monroe, Louisiana, who is a Democratic member of the Louisiana State Senate for the 34th district, serving since 2020. From 2012 until 2020, Jackson served in the Louisiana House of Representatives for the 16th district, which includes Morehouse and Ouachita parishes.

Education
Jackson earned a bachelor's degree from the University of Louisiana at Monroe and a Juris Doctor from the Southern University Law Center in Baton Rouge.

Career
Jackson was elected to the state House in 2011. She serves on the Agriculture, Forestry, Aquaculture, and Rural Development Committee, the Commerce Committee, the Health and Welfare Committee, the Appropriations Committee, the Committee on Joint Budget, and the House Executive Committee. Jackson is a member of the Louisiana Legislative Women's Caucus and the Louisiana Rural Caucus, and is the head of the Louisiana Legislative Black Caucus.

In 2014, Jackson, who unlike most national Democrats opposes abortion, authored House Bill 388, which would require abortion providers to have admitting privileges with a hospital near their clinics. The law was approved in the House with only five dissenters. If passed, it would reportedly have resulted in three of the state's five abortion clinics closing immediately. The bill was argued to be unconstitutional under the precedent set by the decision in Whole Woman's Health v. Hellerstedt, and was struck down as such by the Supreme Court of the United States in June Medical Services, LLC v. Russo in June 2020.

On January 22, 2016, Jackson was a guest speaker at the March for Life in Washington, D.C.

In the nonpartisan blanket primary on October 12, 2019, Jackson was elected unopposed to succeed term-limited Democratic lawmaker Francis C. Thompson for District 34 in the Louisiana State Senate. Thompson is instead seeking to return to the state House in which he served for thirty-three years prior to 2008 and replace the term-limited Republican representative Charles "Bubba" Chaney of Richland Parish.

References

External links
Louisiana State Senate page
Twitter account This account does not exist 16-05-2021.
Instagram account

1977 births
Living people
University of Louisiana at Monroe alumni
Southern University Law Center alumni
Louisiana lawyers
Women state legislators in Louisiana
Democratic Party members of the Louisiana House of Representatives
Democratic Party Louisiana state senators
21st-century American politicians
21st-century American women politicians
African-American state legislators in Louisiana
African-American women in politics